Ludwig Weber may refer to:

 Ludwig Weber (1899–1979), Austrian singer
 Ludwig Weber (pastor) (1846–1922), German Protestant theologian and social reformer